El Regreso or El regreso may refer to:

 El Regreso (film), a 1950 Argentine film
 El Regreso (album), a 2005 live album by Andrés Calamaro
 "El Regreso" (song), a 2005 song by WarCry
 El regreso (telenovela), a 2013–2014 Chilean telenovela
 The Return (2013 film), a Venezuelan drama